St Patrick's, Greencastle are a Gaelic football Club from Greencastle, County Tyrone, Northern Ireland. The club was founded in 1932, under the name Greencastle Erin's Hope.

Greencastle were Tyrone GAA Division 3 and Junior football champions of 2006. They were also Ulster Junior Club Football Championship winners of 2006. They  also went on to win the All-Ireland Junior Club Football Championship in 2007.

Greencastle's manager is Seán Teague, former Tyrone senior football team captain.

Greencastle is one of only three clubs in Tyrone to win an All-Ireland Championship.

Honours
Senior Men
 Tyrone Junior Football Championship (4) 
 1936, 1992, 1998, 2006
 Ulster Junior Club Football Championship 
 2006
 All-Ireland Junior Club Football Championship (1) 
 2007
 Tyrone Intermediate Football League (3) 
 2002, 2009, 2021
 Tyrone Junior Football League (1) 
 1934, 2006

Reserve 

 Tyrone Division 2 Reserve Football League (3) 2003, 2004, 2019
 Tyrone Division 2 Reserve Football Championship (3) 2004, 2018, 2019
 Tyrone Division 3 Reserve Football League (1) 2006

U-21 

 Tyrone Under-21 Grade 2 Football Championship (2) 2008, 2009, 2013

Minor 

 Tyrone Minor Grade 2 Football Championship (1) 1990
 Tyrone Minor Grade 2 Football League (1) 1990
 Tyrone Minor Grade 3 Football Championship (3) 1991, 1994, 2016
 Tyrone Minor Grade 3 Football League (2) 1999, 2016

U-16 

 Tyrone Under-16 Grade 3 Football Championship (1) 2008

U-14 

 Tyrone Under-14 Grade 2 Football Championship (2) 2005, 2010
 Tyrone Under-14 Grade 2 Football League (1) 2005
 Tyrone Under-14 Grade 3 Football League (1) 1994

References

External links
Official Website

Gaelic games clubs in County Tyrone
Gaelic football clubs in County Tyrone